Wernya hamigigantea is a moth in the family Drepanidae. It was described by Da-Yong Xue and Hong-Xiang Han in 2012. It is found in Hainan, China.

References

Moths described in 2012
Thyatirinae
Moths of Asia